The Sonvilier Circular is a 1871 anti-authoritarian treatise by the Jura Federation, a breakaway faction of the First International. Written during their Sonvilier congress, it claimed that hierarchical politics could not produce social revolution, and that authoritarian organization would never produce an egalitarian society. Rather than form political parties, revolutionary organizations had to model the revolutionary society in miniature.

References

Further reading

External links 

 Full text 
 English translation of full text

1871 documents
Jura Federation
Anarchism in Switzerland
Anarchist manifestos
International Workingmen's Association